Hard Not to Love (foaled May 11th, 2016) is a Canadian Thoroughbred racehorse and the winner of the 2019 La Brea Stakes.

Career

Hard Not to Love's first race was on February 16, 2019, at Santa Anita, where she came in first in a Maiden Special Weight Race. The horse then got her second straight win two months later in an April 13, 2019, Allowance Optional Claiming race.

On May 4, 2019, she competed in the listed $75,000 Angels Flight Stakes. She was seen as the second favorite at 9:5 odds behind the 8:5 horse, Sneaking Out.
 She ended up finishing in 2nd after the original winner, Sneaking Out was disqualified for bumping My Miss Rose.

She picked up another win in an October 25, 2019, Allowance Optional Claiming race at Santa Anita Park, and then won her first stakes race - the Grade-1 La Brea Stakes. She came in as the 11:1 underdog an defeated the 3:5 favorite Bellafina by 2 1/4th lengths. The win netted Hard Not to Love $301,404.

On February 15, 2020, she started out her 2020 season with another stakes win. This time, she won the won Grade-2 2020 Santa Monica Stakes. She came in as the 3:5 favorite and delivered, giving her 5 wins in 6 starts. 

On March 14, 2020, she competed in the Grade-1 Beholder Mile Stakes. She came in as the 3:5 favorite but was beaten by 3 1/4th lengths by Ce Ce.

On May 31, 2020, she competed in the Grade-2 Santa Maria Stakes. she came in as the 2:1 second favorite but was defeated, along with Ce Ce by 10:1 longshot  Fighting Mad by 3 1/4th lengths.

Pedigree

References

2016 racehorse births
Racehorses bred in Ontario
Racehorses trained in the United States
Thoroughbred family 17-b